Homoeosoma picoensis is a species of snout moth in the genus Homoeosoma. It was described by Meyer, Nuss and Speidel in 1997, and is known from the Azores.

References

Moths described in 1997
Phycitini